Amara brevicollis is a species of beetle of the genus Amara in the family Carabidae.

brevicollis
Beetles described in 1850